The Fighting Hills massacre occurred in 1840 when Victorian Western District squatters massacred many Aboriginal people of The Hummocks, near Wando Vale, Victoria Australia.

The Whyte brothers (William, George, Pringle and James Whyte) and cousin John Whyte managed the Konongwootong run near Hamilton, Victoria.  On 8 March, the Whytes and three convict employees, Benjamin Wardle, Daniel Turner and William Gillespie, set off to recover sheep stolen the previous day.

The party found Aboriginal people cooking and eating the missing sheep; the subsequent attack killed between 40 and 80 Jardwadjali men, women, and children. The party recovered all but 45 sheep. There was at least one Aboriginal survivor.

Aboriginal protector Charles Sievwright investigated the incident but the depositions he took were disallowed by Crown prosecutor James Croke as they were not "taken in accordance to the rules of law". John Whyte went personally to report the "affray" to Superintendent Charles La Trobe, then Chief Protector George Robinson.  No further action was taken.

Aftermath 

A subsequent massacre known as the Fighting Waterholes massacre took place only months later involving some of the same party.

In 1843, an employee from the Whytes' station was killed - believed to be in retaliation for the massacres.

References 

1840 in Australia
March 1840 events
Massacres of Indigenous Australians
Massacres in 1840